Kimberly Amato (born 1976) is an American actress and author.

Career 
Kimberly Amato was actress, producer, writer, director and editor for Party Girl (2009) and The Mis-Adventures of McT & A! (2010). The television pilot, "Party Girl", won the Aloha Accolade for Excellence in Filmmaking from the Honolulu Film Awards. Amato is a published author. Her publications include the critically acclaimed Steele Series consisting of Steele Intent, Melting Steele and Breaking Steele.

Published works
Steele Intent
Melting Steele
Breaking Steele
Cold Steele
Steele Shield
Enemy

References

External links
Official Website

1976 births
American television actresses
American film actresses
Living people
American lesbian actresses
John Jay College of Criminal Justice alumni
Hofstra University alumni
21st-century American women writers
American lesbian writers